Anna Kaleri (born 1974 in Wippra) is a German writer and screenwriter.

Biography 

Anna Kaleri was born 1974 in the Harz Mountains in the former GDR. She studied from 1996 to 2002 at the German Institute for Literature in Leipzig. After her diploma from this school for writers, she studied Philosophy. Currently, she lives in Leipzig and works freelance since 2002. She writes fiction, screenplays and does journalistic works. Her prose début "This man exists" was published in 2003. Three years later, in 2006, her autobiographical novel "Highlife" which broached the time of Die Wende was published. After years of research, Kaleri wrote the novel "Sky is a mirror" (German: Der Himmel ist ein Fluss, 2012), a fictional approach to the life of her unknown grandmother how died at the end of World War II in Masuria.

Bibliography 

Es gibt diesen Mann, Luchterhand Literaturverlag 2003
Hochleben, Mitteldeutscher Verlag 2006
Der Himmel ist ein Fluss, Graf Verlag 2012 (hardcover), List Verlag 2014 (softcover)

Awards 

1997	Weddinger Literaturpreis
2003	Wiepersdorf – Stipendium der Sächsischen Kulturstiftung
2004	Grenzgängerstipendium der Robert-Bosch-Stiftung
2004	Hörspielstipendium des Deutschen Literaturfonds
2007	Arbeitsstipendium der Sächsischen Kulturstiftung

References

External links 

 
Official Homepage

1974 births
Living people
German screenwriters
German women screenwriters
People from Mansfeld-Südharz
Film people from Saxony-Anhalt